Sarah Gregory may refer to:
Sarah Fullen Gregory, musician with The Gregory Brothers
Sarah Gregory, fictional character on television series The Bedford Diaries

See also
Sara Gregory (born 1986), Welsh actress